The Drue Heinz Literature Prize is a major American literary award for short fiction in the English language.

This prize of the University of Pittsburgh Press  in Pittsburgh, Pennsylvania, United States was initiated in 1981 by Drue Heinz and developed by Frederick A. Hetzel. It has recognized and supported writers of short fiction and made their work available to readers around the world.

The award is open to writers who have published a book-length collection of fiction or at least three short stories or novellas in commercial magazines or literary journals. Manuscripts are judged anonymously by nationally known writers; past judges have included Robert Penn Warren, Joyce Carol Oates, Raymond Carver, Margaret Atwood, Russell Banks, Michael Chabon, Frank Conroy, Richard Ford, John Edgar Wideman, Nadine Gordimer, and Rick Moody. The prize carries a cash award of $15,000 and publication by the University of Pittsburgh Press. The winner is announced in February of each year.

Winners

References

External links
 

Awards established in 1981
Short story awards
1981 establishments in Pennsylvania
American literary awards
American fiction awards
American literature